Tjalfiellidae is a family of ctenophores belonging to the order Platyctenida.

Genera:
 Tjalfiella Mortensen, 1910

Tjalfiella is recorded by Mortensen (1912) from deep water off Greenland, originally classified as member of Platyctenidae. 
Its whole length is about 14 cm, the width is 12 cm — smaller than Lyrocteis imperatoris.

References

Tentaculata